Toxic sludge spill may refer to:
 Ajka alumina plant accident, in Ajka, Hungary on 4 October 2010.
 Kingston Fossil Plant coal fly ash slurry spill, in Roane County, Tennessee, United States on 21 December 2008.
 Martin County sludge spill, in Martin County, Kentucky, United States on 11 October 2000.